Thomas A. Lewis (born January 10, 1972) is a former American football wide receiver in the National Football League for the Chicago Bears and New York Giants. He was drafted by the Giants in the first round of the 1994 NFL Draft out of Indiana University with the 24th pick.  While at Indiana, he set a Big Ten record and tied an NCAA record with a 99-yard touchdown reception against Penn State on November 6, 1993.  That same day, he set a Big Ten record with 285 receiving yards. Thomas Lewis was the Varsity head coach at Chaparral High School in Scottsdale, Arizona for 2 years before resigning on January 12, 2018.

High school career
Lewis attended Garfield High School in Akron, Ohio, where he was an All-Ohio Honorable Mention pick. During his three-year prep career he made 120 receptions, and 14 touchdowns.

1972 births
Living people
American football wide receivers
Chicago Bears players
New York Giants players
Indiana Hoosiers football players
Players of American football from Akron, Ohio